is a 3,168ha. wetland area in Hamanaka-cho, Akkeshi District, Hokkaidō, Japan. It is also called  because numerous flowers can be seen in summer.

Kiritappu wetland is the third largest wetland in Japan, following the Kushiro Shitsugen National Park and Sarobetsu field.

The peatland in the center of Kiritappu wetland (803ha) was nominated as a natural treasure of Japan in 1922. In 1993, it was registered as one of the Ramsar sites.

The local people founded a national trust in 2000, Kiritappu Shitsugen Trust N.P.O., and are making efforts to protect and preserve the wetland.

Location 

Kiritappu Wetland is on the northeast side of Japan, on the east side of Hokkaidō, facing the Pacific Ocean between Kushiro and Nemuro. It is 9 km long and 3 km wide. Hokkaidō road no. 808 runs there which is also called "MG Road" (Marshy Grassland Road).

Flora 
It is called "Wetland of flowers" because there are relatively more flowers compared to other wetlands. These flowers include:

 Lysichiton camtschatcense ミズバショウ、white (June)
 Fritillaria camschatcensis クロユリ、deep purple(June)
 Eriophorum vaginatum ワタスゲ、white cotton (June, July)
 Iris setosa ヒメオウギアヤメ、blue-purple (July)
 Hemerocallis middendorffii エゾカンゾウ、yellow(July)
 Iris ensata var. spontanea ノハナショウブ、red-purple (July)
 Gentiana triflora var. japonica エゾリンドウ blue (September)

References

External links

 Kiritappu Shitsugen Trust N.P.O.
 Kiritappu Wetland Center a visitors' center run by Kiritappu Shitsugen Trust N.P.O.

Natural monuments of Japan
Ramsar sites in Japan
Landforms of Hokkaido
Hamanaka, Hokkaido